NAFTA is an acronym for the North American Free Trade Agreement.

Nafta or NAFTA may also refer to:

 Nafta (oil company), a Soviet Union oil company operating abroad
 National Amalgamated Furnishing Trades Association, or NAFTA, a British trade union
 New Zealand Australia Free Trade Agreement, or NAFTA, a 1965 trade agreement
 NK Nafta Lendava, defunct Slovenian association football team
 NK Nafta 1903, current Slovenian association football team

See also 
 Naphtha, various liquid hydrocarbon intermediates produced from fossil fuel
 Nefta, Tunisia